Périhane Chalabi Cochin, born on 28 May 1965 in Beirut, more commonly known as Péri Cochin, is a French TV host with Lebanese and Iraqi heritage.

Life

Family background 
Chalabi Cochin comes from families of transnational identities with a Shia background. Her father is the Iraqi businessman Talal Chalabi, a brother of the banker and politician Ahmad Chalabi. The Chalabis descend from a Shia dynasty of merchants and bankers in Baghdad. In 1960, Talal married Maha al-Khalil, the heiress of a feudal dynasty in Tyre, Southern Lebanon. Maha's father Kazem al-Khalil was a doyen member of the Lebanese parliament, seven-time minister of the Lebanese government and right-wing militia-leader. Maha al-Khalil's mother Muzain was a daughter of Ibrahim Haydar, a Shi'ite leader from the Beqaa Valley and father-in-law of fellow feudal lord Adel Osseiran, who is considered by some people to be one of the founding fathers of the Lebanese Republic. Talal's brother Ahmad married Leila Osseiran, daughter of Adel Osseiran, in 1971.

References

1965 births
Living people
People from Tyre, Lebanon
Lebanese television actresses
Lebanese emigrants to France
French people of Iraqi descent
French television presenters
Businesspeople from Beirut
French Shia Muslims
French women television presenters
Lebanese women television presenters
Actresses from Beirut